Turkey Point Park is located in Essex, Maryland, United States, an eastern suburb of Baltimore.

It has no relation with Turkey Point, Ontario, Canada. The park was an inspiration for the Turkey Point used by greasers (Drapes) in the 1990 movie Cry-Baby. There are no walking trails through the woods and no toilets or any other facilities. It is locked at dusk due to safety concerns. ATV or vehicle use within the confines of the park is prohibited. Due to neighbors using the park, all dogs must be kept on a leash. 

Parks in Baltimore County, Maryland
Essex, Maryland